The Fiji women's national sevens rugby union team won the gold medal at the 2011 Pacific Games. They qualified for the 2013 Rugby World Cup Sevens. The Fijiana team qualified for the 2016 Olympics by winning the 2015 Oceania Women's Sevens that was held in Auckland, New Zealand. In 2018, they placed 5th at the 2018 Commonwealth Games and 11th at the 2018 Rugby World Cup Sevens.

Fiji also qualified for the 2020 Summer Olympics in Tokyo and went on to win bronze after defeating Great Britain.

Tournament history
A red box around the year indicates tournaments played within Fiji

World Cup

Commonwealth Games

Oceania Women's Sevens results

Summer Olympics

World Rugby Women's Sevens Series

Pacific Games

Players

Current squad
Squad named for the 2023 World Rugby HSBC Sevens Series in Vancouver from the 3–5 March.

Caps updated to the latest date: 5 March 2023

Previous squads

See also

Fiji women's national rugby union team

References

External links
Official website
WorldRugby profile

Women's national rugby sevens teams
sevens
World Rugby Women's Sevens Series core teams